Jean Paul Leon (born 1955) is a French/Spanish artist, sculptor, writer, known mainly for his work Unisson which assembles three art collections on the three Mediterranean Religions, calling for understanding and dialogue among the people of the three cultures. His book Heritage, prefaced by French Minister Jack Lang and recommended by The Louvre Museum curator Lizzie Boubli is the first of the trilogy.

Early years
Jean Paul Leon was raised in France and Spain and educated in England in the Classics, Greek, and Latin. At age 7 and a half, Leon met Pablo Ruíz Picasso, a comrade of his grandfather. Meeting the man and visiting his studio had a major and lasting impact on his life.
At age 11, Leon won a nationwide writing contest sponsored by Coca-Cola.

As a Writer
By 16, Jean Paul Leon had published his first article for the newspaper El Norte de Castilla, under the auspices of laureate Miguel Delibes, where years later, he became a columnist. At 19, he began writing as a freelancer for the magazine Triunfo, publishing in-depth interviews with English folk-singer-songwriters John Martyn, Sandy Denny, Nick Drake, and others. His latest publication is Last Judgement, a short story published by Grafein, Barcelona in April 2015 for the benefit of Doctors Without Borders.
At 18, he began a series of solo art exhibits curated by Chantal Hinaut through the Alliance Française.

Career
By 23, Jean Paul Leon had married and moved to New York City, where, on the very first exhibit of his drawings, he was selected as ‘most promising young artist’ at New York's Washington Square Outdoor Art Exhibit.

At 24, he had his first one-man-show on Madison Avenue, N.Y.C., at Barbara Walter's Gallery. From there, he continued exhibiting until the 90's when he moved to Hollywood to work in the film and animation industry. In 2003, after 12 years in Los Angeles, he returned to Paris, where he began exhibiting again and continued working on a lifelong choice of subject: Light and Luminaries, their contribution to universal culture.

In 2006, Jean Paul Leon's oeuvre, encompassing 30 years of work on the Menorah as conducting wire and symbol of light was assembled in the art book Héritage, prefaced by French Minister of Culture Jack Lang and recommended by The Louvre Museum curator Lizzie Boubli. The book Heritage, which unites the artist's paintings and his writings, in three languages, was edited by Michael Neugebauer, published by MinEdition France  and sponsored by the Culture Mission of La Fondation pour la Mémoire de la Shoah, Paris. while presided by French Minister Simone Veil, survivor of Bergen-Belsen  and first woman President of the European Parliament. Richard Covington, writer for the Smithsonian, New York Times and International Herald Tribune described the work saying: “There's an incandescent energy here that rewards every viewing with unexpected revelations, keeping the eye and brain off-balance and alive”.

During this period, while museum, gallery exhibits and public conferences succeeded one another, Jean Paul Leon started work on a new collection: I.N.R.I. Ieusus Nazarenus Rex Iudeurum (oil on wood panels over large crosses) 33 incisive portraits that depict the figure of Jesus Christ and its varying socio/psychological aspects as His myth travelled through the last 2000 years as explained by Clare McAndrews of Arts Economics  in her article, Jean Paul Leon: Portrait of an Artist. In the prologue to the book I.N.R.I. by Jean Paul León, notable British writer Philip Pullman, author of The Dark Materials & The good man Jesus and the scoundrel Christ, observes: ″These pictures represent a formidable attempt to grapple with the legacy of the most strange and enigmatic man who ever lived.″

In 2007, Jean Paul Leon moved his studio to Dublin, starting with an invitation by publisher and founder Noelle Campbell-Sharp for a residency as an artist at the Cill Rialaig Arts Centre, where he created  Ulysses, Fate and Destiny, an art collection illustrating the 18 chapters of James Joyce's Ulysses (novel), exploring the subject of Leopold Bloom as the figure of the ever wandering Jew, and Homer's  Odysseus as the ultimate hero facing the peril of death at every turn of his journey back home to his kingdom, to his Ithaca.

After completing Ulysses, Fate & Destiny in Dublin, Jean Paul Leon settled in Berlin, focusing his  energy on a pending collection, Reflections of Islam, started in 1978 when, during his honeymoon in the Sahara, he was given a copy of the Qur'an by a fellow traveller. The work was taken up again in 1991, during the invasion of Kuwait, in another desert, the Sonoran Desert, Arizona, where the bulk of the work was created with 3D objects and mirrors that reflect the viewer and incorporate him/her into the artwork, projecting exterior images and interior reflections. The resulting body of work is based on the readings of the text, on contemplation, on the mirror of the desert, on the oasis, on the sand, on the wind, on his love for calligraphy, on the spell of La Alhambra & its unique tendency to travel with him, not only in the arabesque & the filigree of time but on the most ogival confines of the imagination.
The three collections: Hebrew Heritage, I.N.R.I. & Reflections of Islam, conform E.T.C. Espace Three Cultures, supported by the Mayor of Toledo. Three Cultures is the result of Jean Paul Leon's lifelong dedication and his ultimate conviction... considering that when a seeker enters through the threshold of the three monotheistic religions, he secretly expects Maggid – to hear the voice of God – but inevitably stumbles upon the restricted realm of mankind. Ong Namo Guru Dev Namo. In his introduction to the artist, leading Art Appraiser of the City of Paris, Maître Pierre Cornette de St-Cyr, writes: “the light in art, as Jean Paul Leon shows us, will lead us towards intelligence.”

External links
 Official website

References

1955 births
Living people
20th-century French painters
20th-century French male artists
French male painters
21st-century French painters
21st-century French male artists
Modern painters
Place of birth missing (living people)
Modern sculptors
20th-century French sculptors
French male sculptors
20th-century Spanish painters
Spanish male painters
21st-century Spanish painters
Spanish contemporary artists
21st-century Spanish male artists